The 2021–22 South Carolina Gamecocks women's basketball team represented the University of South Carolina during the 2021–22 NCAA Division I women's basketball season. The Gamecocks were led by 14th-year head coach Dawn Staley and played their home games at Colonial Life Arena in Columbia, SC. They competed as members of the Southeastern Conference (SEC). They finished the season 35–2, 15–1 in SEC play to win the regular season championship. They defeated Arkansas and Ole Miss to advance to the championship of the SEC Tournament where they lost to Kentucky. They received an at-large bid to the NCAA Tournament as the No. 1 seed in the Greensboro region. They defeated Howard, Miami, North Carolina, Creighton and Louisville to advance to the championship game. There they defeated UConn for the team's second-ever national title.

Aliyah Boston won Player of the Year and Defensive Player of the Year while head coach Dawn Staley was named Naismith Coach of the Year. The Gamecocks were ranked No. 1 in both polls for the entire year. and finished ranked No. 1 in the AP, Coaches, NET, RPI, ELO, SOS and Massey rankings.

Previous season

The Gamecocks finished the season with a 26–5 overall record and a 14–2 record in conference play. The Gamecocks won the SEC tournament. The Gamecocks therefore received an automatic bid to the 2021 NCAA Division I women's basketball tournament, where they reached the Final Four, losing to Stanford 66–65.

Offseason

2021 recruiting class
The Gamecocks signed the #1 class for 2021 according to ESPN. their second #1 class in three years.

Incoming transfers

Preseason
Hall of Fame coach Dawn Staley enters her fourteenth year at South Carolina, fresh off winning an Olympic Gold Medal in the 2020 Tokyo Olympics winning all six games as head coach of Team USA.

South Carolina was named AP preseason #1 for the second straight season, as they return every player from last years Final Four team, added the #1 recruiting class, adding four 5 star recruits, three of which were ranked in the top 5. They also added ACC Freshman of the year and former 5 star recruit 6'8 Kamillia Cardoso.

Award watch lists

Preseason All-American teams

First team

Aliyah Boston – C

SEC coaches poll
The SEC coaches selected the Gamecocks to finish in first place in the SEC.

Preseason All-SEC teams

First team

Aliyah Boston – C

Zia Cooke – SG

Second team

Destanni Henderson – PG

Roster

Starting lineup

Schedule

|-
!colspan=9 style=| Exhibition

|-
!colspan=9 style=| Regular season

|-
!colspan=9 style=| SEC tournament

|-
!colspan=9 style=| NCAA tournament

Statistics

Team total per game

Team average per game

Individual total per game

Individual average per game

Rankings

Awards and honors
 Aliyah Boston
 Naismith Player of the Year
 United States Basketball Writers Association Player of the Year
 Wade Trophy
 John R. Wooden Award
 Ann Meyers Drysdale Women's Player of the Year
 Associated Press Player of the Year
 Naismith Women's Defensive Player of the Year
 NCAA basketball tournament Most Outstanding Player
 Lisa Leslie Award
 Academic All-American of the Year
 Associated Press first-team All-American
 United States Basketball Writers Association first-team All-American
 Women's Basketball Coaches Association All-American
 SEC Player of the Year
 First-team All-SEC
 SEC Defensive Player of the Year
 SEC All-Defensive Team

 Destanni Henderson
 United States Basketball Writers Association third-team All-American
 First-team All-SEC

 Zia Cooke
 Second-team All-SEC

 Dawn Staley
Naismith College Coach of the Year
WBCA National Coach of the Year Award
USBWA Women's National Coach of the Year
 SEC Coach of the Year

See also
2021–22 South Carolina Gamecocks men's basketball team

References

South Carolina Gamecocks women's basketball seasons
South Carolina
South Carolina Gamecocks w
South Carolina Gamecocks w
South Carolina
NCAA Division I women's basketball tournament Final Four seasons
NCAA Division I women's basketball tournament championship seasons